Andriy Petrovych Kireyev (born 27 September 2001) is a Ukrainian professional footballer who plays as a defensive midfielder for Dnipro-1.

References

External links
 
 
 

2001 births
Living people
Footballers from Dnipro
Ukrainian footballers
Association football midfielders
SC Dnipro-1 players
FC Nikopol players
Ukrainian Second League players